Dorcadion albolineatum is a species of beetle in the family Cerambycidae. It was described by Küster in 1847.

References

albolineatum
Beetles described in 1847